Piloto Osvaldo Marques Dias Airport  is the airport serving Alta Floresta, Brazil.

It is operated by Aeroeste.

History
On March 15, 2019 Aeroeste won a 30-year concession to operate the airport.

Airlines and destinations

Access

See also

List of airports in Brazil

References

External links

Airports in Mato Grosso